The LJN Video Art is an educational home video game console that was developed and manufactured by LJN. It was launched in 1987 with a two-year market presence of mostly negative critical reviews but sharing retail prestige among hit toys. It was discontinued in late 1989 at a heavy price drop, as ultimately a commercial failure. It is LJN's only video game console, and only nine games were made for it.

Gameplay
Core functionality is similar to basic personal computer paint programs. There are two main inputs on the system's controllera joystick controlling a cursor to draw lines and curves, and a slider to select up to 16 colors. Turning on the system without a cartridge inserted gives a blank screen for drawing. The game library is mostly based on themed coloring books, connect the dots, and puzzles. Animations can be made by creating a series of drawings and recording a slide show to a VCR. Video Art Activity Cartridge is included, with several outline drawings that can be colored.

Games
This is the Video Art game cartridge library:

Video Art Activity Cartridge
A Trip To The Zoo
Disney Coloring Book
Disney Story Book
Looney Tunes
Marvel Super-Heroes
My Dream Day
My Favorite Doll
On the Move

Marketing 
Video Art was positioned against a wide range of educational toys and interactive television systems, such as View-Master Interactive Vision and VideoSmarts, and against television itself. It was sold alongside, but not directly positioned against, mainstream game consoles such as the Nintendo Entertainment System and the Sega Master System. A patent was filed in 1986, granted in 1988.

In 1987, LJN spent most of its $5 million TV and print advertising budget on Gotcha! and Video Art. A TV advertisement includes a rap-style beat, saying "Watching TV, watching TV, you just keep searching for something to see. But then my mom, she got smart! She got me Video Art!"

Reception
The Philadelphia Daily News said likewise, also including LJN's own Gotcha! paintball game.

The console was mostly panned by critics. On December 2, 1987 USA Today negatively reviewed a list of toys that "deserve to be dumped", calling Video Art "A costly color Etch-a-Sketch for your TV set that's much harder to work and not much fun. The results don't look nearly as lush and well-defined as those shown on the TV ads." On December 6, 1987, Newsday reviewed a variety of educational and artistic electronic toys, saying of Video Art that "The toy's most innovative feature is its animation potential. You can make cartoons by recording your drawings one at a time on your VCR, then playing them back." In 1989, Catherine Cella of the Entertainment News Service reviewed Video Art, saying that "the slightest touch sends the cursor all over the screen, making even the simplest drawing impossible" and found the included Video Art Activity Cartridge to be capable of only "video scribbling". She said Video Art was one of the less successful interactive video machines compared to View-Master Interactive Vision and VideoSmarts.

References

External links
 
 Page from Video Game Bible

Third-generation video game consoles
Products introduced in 1987
Drawing video games